Cai Gongshi (May 1, 1881 - May 3, 1928) was a Chinese nationalist politician and diplomat. Born in Jiujiang, Jiangxi, Cai studied economics and politics at Imperial University in Tokyo, Japan, earning a master's degree. Upon his return to China, he joined Sun Yat-sen's Kuomintang (KMT), and later served in various roles in the Chinese nationalist government. In 1927, he was appointed Superintendent of Customs and Commissioner of Foreign Affairs in Nanjing. On 1 May 1928, he was appointed Commissioner of Foreign Affairs for Shandong province, and was tasked with negotiating for Japanese withdrawal from the province. He was subsequently killed on 3 May by Japanese soldiers during the Jinan incident. According to Chinese sources, the Japanese soldiers broke his leg, smashed his teeth, cut out his tongue, and shot him. 16 other members of his negotiation team were also mutilated and killed on the same day.

References

Executed Republic of China people
1881 births
1928 deaths
Diplomats of the Republic of China
Politicians from Jiujiang
Republic of China politicians from Jiangxi
People executed by Japanese occupation forces
People executed by Japan by firearm
20th-century executions by Japan
Executed people from Jiangxi